The Russian Mixed Doubles Curling Championship are the annual national curling championships for mixed doubles curling in Russia. As of 2018, the event consisted of twenty teams participating in a preliminary round robin and a single-knockout playoff.

Past champions

All time medals
One common table for men and women players. As of the conclusion of the 2022 Russian Mixed Doubles Curling Championship (without results of 2011 Championship, because it can't be found yet).

References

External links
Russian Curling Federation
Curling in Russia

See also
Russian Curling Championships
Russian Mixed Doubles Curling Cup

 
Mixed doubles
Recurring sporting events established in 2007